Calrossie was a railway station on the Woodside railway line in Victoria, Australia, and opened in December 1921. It closed in May 1953, along with the other stations on the line, apart from Yarram.

References

Disused railway stations in Victoria (Australia)
Transport in Gippsland (region)
Shire of Wellington